George Henry Barber (23 August 1884 – 28 May 1938) was a Canadian athlete. He competed in four jumping events  at the 1908 Summer Olympics.

References

1884 births
1938 deaths
Athletes (track and field) at the 1908 Summer Olympics
Canadian male long jumpers
Canadian male high jumpers
Olympic track and field athletes of Canada
Athletes from Toronto
Olympic male high jumpers